Robert Smail Whitelaw Wilson (born 29 June 1934) is a Scottish former professional footballer.  Primarily a half-back, he began his professional career with Aberdeen, before going on to play for a number of English clubs.  He was captain of the original incarnation of Accrington Stanley when the club resigned from The Football League in 1962.

Career
Born in Musselburgh, Wilson began his career with local Junior club Musselburgh Athletic before joining Aberdeen in November 1954.  He gained a place in the club's first team during the 1955–56 season and played in the team which beat St Mirren to win the Scottish League Cup that season.

In May 1957 Wilson left Scotland and joined Norwich City of the Football League Third Division South.  He was a regular in his first season but soon lost his starting place and in 1960 he took the decision to leave Carrow Road and join Gillingham of the Fourth Division.  He made 35 Football League appearances for the club, but chose to move on at the end of the 1960–61 season.  A number of Scottish clubs were interested in signing him, but he chose to remain in England and join Accrington Stanley, also of the Fourth Division.  He became club captain, but in March 1962 Stanley resigned from the Football League due to financial problems, making Wilson the last man ever to captain the club in a professional match.  Wilson joined another Fourth Division club, Chester, where he played 15 times.  He then left the professional game and dropped into non-league football with Shropshire-based GKN Sankey.

References

External links 

1934 births
Aberdeen F.C. players
Accrington Stanley F.C. (1891) players
Association football wing halves
Gillingham F.C. players
Living people
Norwich City F.C. players
Sportspeople from Musselburgh
Scottish Football League players
Scottish footballers
English Football League players
GKN Sankey F.C. players
Musselburgh Athletic F.C. players
Scottish Junior Football Association players
Footballers from East Lothian